Motoya (written: 本谷 or 元谷) is a Japanese surname. Notable people with the surname include:

, Japanese writer, publisher and businessman
, Japanese writer, playwright and theatre director

Japanese-language surnames